Alice Lang (born 18 March 1983) is an Australian contemporary artist. She works and lives in Los Angeles, CA.  Lang has mounted many solo exhibitions of her work, and participated extensively in group exhibitions. She has held residencies in Canada, New York, and Los Angeles.

Lang's work is often feminist in nature, utilising mixed media. Lang often creates sculptural forms involving the female body that are surreal and organic in appearance.

Early life and education
Lang grew up in Byron Bay, New South Wales. In 2004 she gained a Bachelor of Fine Arts with First Class Honours from Queensland University of Technology, Brisbane, QLD, Australia, specializing in visual arts. Lang graduated with an MFA from CalArts in 2015.

Career
Lang's work was included in the Institute of Modern Art’s 2004 Brisbane exhibition of recent art school graduates.

In 2007 her art was included in the "Topsy" exhibition at the Metro Arts Gallery. Her "soft sculptures" were part of the 2008 show Together Forever at the Broadway Gallery in New York.

In 2010, Lang co-founded LEVEL, an artist-run initiative and feminist collective in Brisbane Australia with artists Courtney Coombs, and Rachel Haynes.

In 2013, Lang was a finalist for the churchie national emerging art prize.  Her work Boxcopy Slide Night was on exhibit at the Metro Arts Gallery.

In 2016 Lang's work was included in an exhibition at the Melbourne International Comedy Festival. She also contributed works to the Fragmented Gaze exhibit at the Los Angeles Tiger Strikes Asteroid Gallery.

Grants and awards 
Lang has been the recipient of many grants and awards including the Queensland Art Gallery Melville Haysom Scholarship (2009), the Australia Council Emerging Artist New Work Grant (2012), the Lord Mayor's Young and Emerging Artist Fellowship (2012) and the Freedman Foundation Traveling Scholarship for Emerging Artists (2013).

Exhibitions

Selected solo exhibitions 
 2021 Cool story bro, Louise Alexander Gallery/AF Projects, Los Angeles, CA, USA 
 2016 BLOWBACK, Karen Woodbury Gallery, Melbourne, AUS
 2015 AIRHEADS, CalArts, Los Angeles, CA, USA
 2013 Womp Womp Womp Womp, CalArts, Los Angeles, CA, USA
 2013 OM NOM NOM NOM, Boxcopy, Brisbane, QLD, AUS
 2013 Forget I Said Anything, RAID Projects studio space, Los Angeles, CA, USA
 2012 Teetering at the Edge of Rock Bottom, InFlight ARI, Hobart, TAS, AUS
 2011 Multiple Visions, Grantpirrie window space, Redfern, Sydney, NSW, AUS
 2010 Just in Case, Museum of Brisbane, Brisbane, QLD, AUS
 2010 Crossing Over, Firstdraft, Surrey Hills, Sydney, NSW, AUS

Selected group exhibitions 

 2017 Let's Talk About Art, Artbank, Sydney, NSW, AUS
 2017 Close Enough, Caloundra Regional Gallery, Caloundra, QLD, AUS
 2016 Domestic Observations, JACE Space, Los Angeles, CA, USA
 2016 The Wicked Tongue, Charlie James Gallery, Los Angeles, CA, USA
 2016 Unfolding/Folding, KINGS, Melbourne, AUS
 2016 Spring 1883, Karen Woodbury Gallery, Melbourne, AUS
 2016 2017, Art Centre, Pasadena, CA, USA
 2016 Is This Thing On?, Counihan Gallery in Brunswick, Melbourne, AUS

References

External links
CV of Alice Lang
"Alice Lang You Beauty".  The Churchie Awards, page 46.
"A Material Concern: The Art of Alice Lang" profile by Tim Walsh. Das Super Pape 20 (August 2011).
LEVEL art collective

1984 births
Living people
Australian contemporary artists
Australian feminists
Artists from New South Wales
Queensland University of Technology alumni